The Huntington Hornets were a professional ice hockey team that played in Huntington, West Virginia as a member of the International Hockey League during the 1956–57 season. The team was relocated to Huntington from Grand Rapids, Michigan where they played as the Grand Rapids Rockets. The Huntington Hornets played their home games at the 4,100 seat Veterans Memorial Fieldhouse. They finished third overall in the International Hockey League's 1956–57 season. The team suffered from low attendance, prompting owner Ernie Berg to begin seeking for a new home as early as December, 1956. Local promoter Dick Deutsch attempted to keep the team in Huntington twice by seeking local investments. Ultimately, the attempts fell short, and the team was slated for suspension of operations or relocation. The IHL eventually approved relocation of the franchise to Louisville, Kentucky, where the team was rebranded as the Rebels.

Standings

Roster

References

Ice hockey clubs established in 1956
International Hockey League (1945–2001) teams
Defunct ice hockey teams in the United States
Sports clubs disestablished in 1957
1956 establishments in West Virginia
1957 disestablishments in West Virginia
Ice hockey teams in West Virginia
Sports in Huntington, West Virginia